Filippo Cremonesi (22 August 1872 – 19 May 1942) was an Italian banker and politician. He was born in Rome, Kingdom of Italy. He was mayor of Rome from 1922 to 1926 and the first Fascist Governor of Rome in 1926. He was a recipient of the Order of Saints Maurice and Lazarus. He died in Rome, Italy.

References

1872 births
1942 deaths
Italian bankers
20th-century Italian politicians
Mayors of Rome
Recipients of the Order of Saints Maurice and Lazarus
Members of the Senate of the Kingdom of Italy